My Mother's Teahouse is a 1988 Taiwanese drama film directed by Chen Kunhou. The film was selected as the Taiwanese entry for the Best Foreign Language Film at the 61st Academy Awards, but was not accepted as a nominee.

Cast
 Sylvia Chang
 Tony Leung Ka Fai
 Yang Chieh-mei

See also
 List of submissions to the 61st Academy Awards for Best Foreign Language Film
 List of Taiwanese submissions for the Academy Award for Best Foreign Language Film

References

External links
 

1988 films
1988 drama films
Taiwanese drama films
Mandarin-language films